

Rudolf Konrad (7 March 1891 – 10 June 1964) was a German general in the Wehrmacht during World War II who served as a corps commander. He was a recipient of the Knight's Cross of the Iron Cross and, by the end of the war, held the rank of General der Gebirgstruppe, (General of Mountain Troops).

Life and career
Rudolf Konrad was born in Kulmbach in Northern Bavaria on 7 March 1891. He entered the German Army in July 1910 as an ensign. Joining a Bavarian Field Artillery Regiment in October 1912 as a Lieutenant, he served with them in World War I.

He remained in the Reichswehr after 1918, rising to command a Gebirgsjager (Mountain) Regiment from October 1935. Becoming a staff officer, in 1940 he became chief of staff of XVIII Corps, then of 2nd Army. He was then given a field command, first of 7th Mountain Division then, for most of the period from December 1941 to May 1944, of XXXXIX Mountain Corps on the Eastern Front. He received the Knight's Cross of the Iron Cross in August 1942 for his command of this corps. Finally, he commanded LXVIII Corps from early 1945 until the end of the war. 

In 1966 the Bundeswehr barracks in Bad Reichenhall was named 'General Konrad Barracks'. In August 2012 it was renamed 'Hochstaufen Barracks', Christian Schmidt the Federal Minister of Defence describing the previous name as outdated.

Awards and decorations

As a General of Mountain Troops and commander of XXXXIX Mountain Corps Konrad received:
 mention in the Wehrmachtbericht (Armed Forces Report) of 27 July 1942 for his role in the capture of Bataisk, near Rostov; 
 the Knight's Cross of the Iron Cross on 1 August 1942;
 the German Cross in Gold on 23 February 1944.

References

Citations

Bibliography

 
 

 

1891 births
1964 deaths
Generals of Mountain Troops
German prisoners of war in World War II
Recipients of the Gold German Cross
Recipients of the Knight's Cross of the Iron Cross
Military personnel from Bavaria
People from Kulmbach